"When God Comes and Gathers His Jewels" is a hymn written by Hank Williams.  It was the B-side to his second single, "Wealth Won't Save Your Soul," released in 1947 on Sterling Records.  Williams wrote and performed spiritual music throughout his career on his radio shows and in concert, usually closing personal appearances with his famous gospel number "I Saw the Light."  He recorded this song on December 11, 1946 at WSM Studios in Nashville with Fred Rose producing and was backed on the session by the Willis Brothers, who also went by the name of the Oklahoma Wranglers: James "Guy" Willis (guitar), Vic Wallis (accordion), Charles "Skeeter" Willis (fiddle), and Charles "Indian" Wright (bass).

Discography

References

1946 songs
Songs written by Hank Williams
Hank Williams songs
Song recordings produced by Fred Rose (songwriter)